Le Frisson des Vampires (English: The Shiver of the Vampires,  The Thrill of the Vampires) is a 1971 film directed by Jean Rollin. It is his third vampire movie.

Plot
Two newlyweds, Isle and Antoine, are on their honeymoon, on their way to visit Isle's two cousins. When they arrive in the town they discover that her cousins died the day before. Isle and Antoine go to the chateau where they lived anyway. Once there they are greeted by two female Renfields who show them to a room.

Isle goes to the cemetery to visit the graves of her cousins, and a woman named Isabelle tells Isle that she was about to marry both of her cousins, but in a way she was already their brides. Isle decides to sleep alone on that night because she is upset. While getting ready for bed a woman emerges from the grandfather clock. She introduces herself as Isolde and takes Isle back to the cemetery where she bites Isle in the neck. Antoine, feeling lonely, goes to see Isle, but she isn't in her room. He searches the castle and comes to the chapel where it seems a human sacrifice is taking place. Two of the participants turn out to be Isle's cousins and explain they must kill the woman or she will become like them — vampires. Antoine goes back to find Isle in her room and isn't sure whether it was all a dream.

The next morning at breakfast the Renfields tell Isle and Antoine that her cousins aren't really dead. Antoine goes to the library to meet the cousins but is instead knocked out by books. When he comes to, Antoine goes back to the dining room where he finally meets the cousins. That night Isle decided to sleep alone again, leaving Antoine angry. Isolde returns to Isle and bites her in the neck again. Isabelle tells a friend that Isle's cousins were once vampire slayers and were bitten by vampires. Isabelle later discovers that the cousins are still alive and under Isolde's control and Isolde tells her she is no longer welcome at the castle. She grabs Isabelle and pierces her breasts with her pointed nipple covers. Angry at her for doing this the cousins rape Isolde.

That night the Renfields wake Antoine and take him to the chapel where a ceremony is about to take place that involves Isle, Isolde, the Renfields and the cousins. Antoine breaks open the door to discover they have all disappeared. Unsure whether this was also a dream, he runs to Isle's room to tell her they must escape. She tells him no and that her cousins are the only family she has left, so Antoine decides to sleep on the couch in her room. The next morning Isle cries out that the sunlight hurts her eyes when Antoine opens the curtains. That night is Isle's initiation when she will be given the final kiss and made a vampire. Antoine tries to break it up by taking Isle away. The cousins follow them to a beach. Isolde tries to get into her coffin but finds it on fire. The Renfields put a cross on the tomb door, sealing Isolde inside, so Isolde bites her wrist and dies. Antoine begs Isle to go with him but she stays with her cousins as they await the sunrise.

Cast
 Sandra Julien as Isla
 Jean-Marie Durand as Antoine
 Jacques Robiolles
 Michel Delahaye
 Marie-Pierre Castel
 Kuelan Herce
 Nicole Nancel as Isabelle
 Dominique as Isolde

Other titles
The title Le Frisson des Vampires has been translated into many titles in English, including: 
 The Shiver of the Vampires
 Sex and Vampires
 Strange Things Happen at Night
 Terror of the Vampires
 Thrill of the Vampire
 Vampire Thrills

Home media
Le Frisson des Vampires was released on VHS, in a full-frame version, in the UK by Redemption Films on 27 September 1993.

It was released on DVD by Encore in Europe as a two-disc set including a new 16:9/1.77:1 anamorphic widescreen version, digitally remastered French and English (dubbed) audio tracks, a slideshow of rare photos, audio commentary by Rollin, deleted scenes, the original trailer and a 32-page booklet.<ref>{{cite web |url=http://encore-films.com |title=Special Edition DVD for Le Frisson des Vampires |publisher=encore-films.com |date= |access-date=1 July 2010}}</ref> It was released on DVD again by Redemption on 27 September 2004 in the UK, and in the US on the 14 September 1999 by Image Entertainment.

The film was issued on Blu-ray in 2012 by Kino Lorber as part of a five-disc collection, along with La Rose de Fer, Fascination, La Vampire Nue and Lèvres de Sang.

Reception
In a contemporary review, the Monthly Film Bulletin'' stated, "Excellent visual qualities outweigh an inadequate narrative and some irritating music".

References

External links
 Le Frisson des Vampires at the Internet Movie Database

French vampire films
1971 horror films
Films directed by Jean Rollin
Films set in castles
1971 films
1970s French-language films
LGBT-related horror films
1971 LGBT-related films
1970s French films